"Ein bißchen Frieden" ("A Bit of Peace") is a German-language song, written by prolific German Eurovision-writing duo Ralph Siegel (music) and Bernd Meinunger (lyrics) for the Eurovision Song Contest 1982, held in Harrogate, United Kingdom. It was performed by 17-year-old German high-school student Nicole Hohloch, resulting in 's first win at the Eurovision Song Contest by a record margin of 61 points, setting a new record for the largest winning margin that lasted until the Eurovision Song Contest 1997. Nicole's single is still the only Eurovision entry to top the sales charts in every territory it was released in.

Background
After winning the contest, Nicole performed the reprise in four different languages: German, English, French and Dutch. She decided on the spur of the moment to do this, to the bewilderment of her backing group. She later released recordings in five additional languages across Europe: Danish, Italian, Russian, and a German-English-Dutch combination and a German-English-Italian combination. It topped the charts in many countries, selling more than three million copies, and the English version was the last Eurovision winner to top the charts in the United Kingdom. The English version also holds the honour of becoming the 500th British Number One.

The song was chosen in an internet poll conducted by the European Broadcasting Union in 2005 as one of the 14 most popular songs in the history of the Eurovision, and was one of the entrants in the Congratulations 50th anniversary concert in Copenhagen, Denmark, held in October 2005. Although Nicole was not at the concert, it was re-enacted by dancers equipped with white guitars and a live orchestra as the original footage was shown in the background. "Ein bißchen Frieden" finished as the seventh most popular song in the history of the contest.

"A Little Peace", the  English version (translated by Paul Greedus), was soon after released in predominantly English speaking territories and reached number 1 on the charts in the  UK and Ireland, among others.

"A Little Peace" was covered by Daniel O'Donnell for his 1997 album I Believe.

In 1996, the Swedish techno/folk/bluegrass band Rednex, known for their hit Cotton-Eye Joe around that time, did a cover of "Ein bißchen Frieden", also played in the Eurovision Song Contest. The song has since been rendered in Dutch as "Een Beetje Vrede" recorded by Kathleen Aerts for her 2009 album In Symfonie.

Monica Forsberg wrote lyrics in Swedish as "En liten fågel", and the song became popular among dansband groups. It was recorded in Swedish by Stefan Borsch on his 1982 album En liten fågel as well as releasing it as a single the same year and Mats Bergmans on his 2004 album Vänd dig inte om. It was also recorded by Ingmar Nordströms on 1982 album Saxparty 9.

German techno-punk band DAF released "Ein bißchen Krieg" ("A Bit of War") as a response to the supposed sentimentality of the song.

Chart positions

Ein bißchen Frieden

A Little Peace

See also
 Nicole Seibert discography

References

External links

Detailed info & lyrics, Diggiloo Thrush

1982 singles
Songs written by Bernd Meinunger
Anti-war songs
Peace songs
Schlager songs
Congratulations Eurovision songs
Eurovision songs of 1982
Eurovision songs of Germany
European Hot 100 Singles number-one singles
Number-one singles in Finland
Number-one singles in Germany
Dutch Top 40 number-one singles
Ultratop 50 Singles (Flanders) number-one singles
Number-one singles in Norway
Number-one singles in Sweden
Number-one singles in Switzerland
UK Singles Chart number-one singles
Eurovision Song Contest winning songs
Songs written by Ralph Siegel
German-language songs
Stefan Borsch songs
Ingmar Nordströms songs
1982 songs